William Floyd Clipson (December 30, 1920 – June 25, 1996) was an American football and basketball coach. He served as the head football coach at Troy State University—now known as Troy University—in Troy, Alabama from 1955 to 1965, compiling a record of 26–68. Clipson was the head basketball coach at Florida Southern College from 1952 to 1955, tallying a mark of 22–45. Clipson died on June 25, 1996, at his home in Tuscaloosa, Alabama.

Head coaching record

College football

References

External links
 

1920 births
1996 deaths
Florida Southern Moccasins men's basketball coaches
Troy Trojans football coaches
High school football coaches in Alabama
University of Alabama alumni
Troy University alumni